is a Japanese football player. He plays for Matsumoto Yamaga FC.

Career
Masato Tokida joined J1 League club Vegalta Sendai in 2016. On March 15, 2017, he debuted in J.League Cup (v FC Tokyo). In August, he moved to Oita Trinita.

Club statistics
Updated to 18 February 2019.

References

External links
Profile at Vegalta Sendai

1997 births
Living people
Association football people from Saitama Prefecture
Japanese footballers
J1 League players
J2 League players
Vegalta Sendai players
Oita Trinita players
Matsumoto Yamaga FC players
Association football defenders